The 2021 Incarnate Word Cardinals football team represented the University of the Incarnate Word (UIW) in the 2021 NCAA Division I FCS football season as a member of the Southland Conference. The Cardinals played their home games at Gayle and Tom Benson Stadium in San Antonio, 
Texas. They were led by fourth-year head coach Eric Morris.

On November 12, 2021, Incarnate Word announced that this will be the last season for the team in the Southland and will then join the Western Athletic Conference on July 1, 2022. However, UIW announced they would remain in the Southland in late June and would not join the WAC.

Previous season

The Cardinals finished the 2020 season with a 3–3 record in regular and conference play (3rd in the Southland) during the shortened season due to the COVID-19 pandemic. On August 13, 2020, Incarnate Word announced it was is postponing all competition for the Fall 2020 and instead opted for a Spring 2021 season, which was soon followed suit with majority of FCS deciding to play in the spring as well. Two of the Cardinals' three wins were against FCS ranked teams. Incarnate Word did not qualify for postseason tournament play for the second year in a row. At the conclusion of the season, Cardinals' starting quarterback Cameron Ward received the highly coveted STATS Perform FCS Jerry Rice Award, given to the top freshman player in the FCS level.

Preseason

Preseason poll
The Southland Conference released their preseason poll in July 2021. The Cardinals were picked to finish third in the conference. In addition, fifteen Cardinals were chosen to the Preseason All-Southland Team.

Preseason All–Southland Teams

Offense

1st Team
Kevin Brown – Running Back, SR
Robert Ferrel – Wide Receiver, SR

2nd Team
Cameron Ward – Quarterback, SO
Caleb Johnson – Offensive Lineman, SR
Nash Jones – Offensive Lineman, SO
Reid Francis – Offensive Lineman, RS-FR
Carson Mohr – Kicker, JR

Defense

1st Team
Cameron Preston – Defensive Lineman, SR
Kelechi Anyalebechi – Linebacker, SR
Ce'Cori Tolds – Kick Returner, SR
Robert Ferrel – Punt Returner, SR

2nd Team
Blaine Hoover – Defensive Lineman, RS-SR
Isaiah Paul – Linebacker, RS-SO
Shawn Holton – Defensive Back, JR
Elliott Davison – Defensive Back, SO

Schedule

Personnel

Coaching staff
Source:

Roster
Source:

Depth chart

Postseason honors
The following Cardinals received postseason honors for the 2021 season:

Associated Press FCS All-American Second–Team
WR  Taylor Grimes – Junior

Associated Press FCS All-American Third–Team
LB  Kelechi Anyalebechi – Senior

Stats Perform FCS All-American Second–Team
QB  Cameron Ward – Sophomore
WR  Taylor Grimes – Junior

Stats Perform FCS All-American Third–Team
LB  Kelechi Anyalebechi – Senior

HERO Sports FCS All-American Second–Team
WR  Taylor Grimes – Junior

Southland Conference Offensive Player of the Year
QB  Cameron Ward – Sophomore

Southland Conference Coach of the Year
Eric Morris

All–Southland Conference First–Team
RB  Kevin Brown – Graduate Senior
WR  Taylor Grimes – Junior
OL  Nash Jones – Sophomore
DL  Cameron Preston – Senior
LB  Kelechi Anyalebechi – Senior
DB  Kaleb Culp – Sophomore
PR  Robert Ferrel – Senior

All–Southland Conference Second–Team
QB  Cameron Ward – Sophomore
WR  Robert Ferrel – Senior
P   Keven Nguyen – Senior
DL  Brandon Bowen – Graduate Senior
LB  Isaiah Paul – Sophomore
DB  Rashon Davis – Graduate Senior

All–Southland Conference Third–Team
RB  Marcus Cooper – Graduate Senior
WR  Darion Chafin – Senior
OL  Reid Francis – Junior
OL  Caleb Johnson – Senior
OL  Dawson Kier – Senior
DL  Blaine Hoover – Senior
DB  Elliott Davison – Sophomore
DB  Moses Reynolds – Senior
DB  Brandon Richard – Junior

Game summaries

@ Youngstown State

Prairie View A&M

@ Texas State

McNeese State

@ Northwestern State

Nicholls

@ McNeese State

Houston Baptist

No. 6 Southeastern Louisiana

@ Nicholls

@ Houston Baptist

FCS Playoffs

Stephen F. Austin–First Round

@ Sam Houston–Second Round

Rankings

References

Incarnate Word Cardinals football seasons
Incarnate Word
Southland Conference football champion seasons
2021 NCAA Division I FCS playoff participants
Incarnate Word Cardinals football